The Tridge is the formal name of a three-way wooden footbridge spanning the confluence of the Chippewa and Tittabawassee Rivers in Chippewassee Park near downtown Midland, Michigan, in the Tri-Cities region. Named as a portmanteau of "tri" and "bridge", the structure opened in 1981.

History
The bridge was constructed in 1981 at the instigation of the Midland Area Community Foundation (MACF). The bridge cost $732,000 to build, and took 6,400 hours of labor. The Tridge was designed by Commonwealth Associates of Jackson and built for a design load of 85 pounds per square foot of deck area and to handle 1,500 people at a time. Gerace Construction Company worked on the project. As a symbol, the bridge has been popularized and is the subject, for example, of lithographs.

The Tridge was closed in November 2011 due to work on the rails-to-trails project and the construction of a new canoe launch site.

In April 2017, the Tridge was closed for renovations with all stain to be removed and restained and some board replacements. The bridge's full reopening would happen in October with a partial reopening on the Fourth of July. Rollin M. Gerstacker Foundation donated $2.5 million towards the project.

Recreation
The Tridge is a tourist attraction. It and its two surrounding parks— in Chippewassee and St. Charles parks—are one of the most popular leisure areas downtown.  The  Chippewa Nature Trail begins at the bridge.

The site also marks the starting point of the Pere Marquette Rail Trail, a Michigan Rails to Trails Conservancy Hall of Fame trail. Although being mainly a footbridge, bicycles, skateboards, and in-line skates are also allowed on the bridge. It is the focal point for summer evening concerts.  Fishing is generally not permitted from the bridge although it does occur frequently.

The Tridge, located beside the Midland farmers market, has become an icon of the city and is the most famous landmark of the downtown area.  Each year, the Tridge mimics the Mackinac Bridge to the north, in hosting a "Labor Day walk".  The festive annual event is sponsored by MACF and the Chippewa Nature Center, and led by the mayor of Midland.  In addition, St. Charles Park, which surrounds the Tridge, is host to many public and private events. At night, the bridge's arches are lit.

During summer evenings, the Tridge is a popular hangout spot for local teens largely because it is near the Downtown area and several popular areas.

References

External links

Tridge photographs
Midland River Days poster featuring The Tridge

Bridges completed in 1981
Buildings and structures in Midland County, Michigan
Geography of Midland County, Michigan
Midland, Michigan
Pedestrian bridges in Michigan
Protected areas of Midland County, Michigan
Rail trails in Michigan
Through arch bridges in the United States
Transportation in Midland County, Michigan
Three-way bridges
Wooden bridges in Michigan